The 1990 Southland Conference men's basketball tournament was held March 5–7 at Fant-Ewing Coliseum in Monroe, Louisiana.

Northeast Louisiana defeated  in the championship game, 84–68, to win their first Southland men's basketball tournament.

The Warhawks received a bid to the 1990 NCAA Tournament as the #15 seed in the Midwest region.

Format
All seven of the conference's members participated in the tournament field. They were seeded based on regular season conference records, with the top team earning a bye into the semifinal round. The other six teams began play in the quarterfinal round.

Games in the quarterfinal round were played at the home court of the higher-seeded team. All remaining games were played at Fant-Ewing Coliseum in Monroe, Louisiana.

Bracket

References

Southland Conference men's basketball tournament
Tournament
Southland Conference men's basketball tournament
Southland Conference men's basketball tournament
Basketball competitions in Louisiana
Sports in Monroe, Louisiana
College sports tournaments in Louisiana